1728 Goethe Link, provisional designation , is a stony asteroid and relatively slow rotator from the central region of the asteroid belt, approximately 16 kilometers in diameter.

It was discovered on 12 October 1964, by Indiana University during its Indiana Asteroid Program at Goethe Link Observatory in Brooklyn, Indiana, United States. It was named after American philanthropist and founder of the discovering observatory Goethe Link.

Orbit and classification 

Goethe Link orbits the Sun in the central main-belt at a distance of 2.3–2.8 AU once every 4 years and 1 month (1,499 days). Its orbit has an eccentricity of 0.09 and an inclination of 7° with respect to the ecliptic.

Physical characteristics 

Goethe Link has been characterized as a common S-type asteroid.

Rotation period 

In October 2005, a rotational lightcurve of Goethe Link was obtained by French amateur astronomer Laurent Bernasconi. It gave a long rotation period of 81 hours with a brightness variation of 0.39 magnitude.

Diameter and albedo 

According to the surveys carried out the Japanese Akari satellite and NASA's Wide-field Infrared Survey Explorer with its subsequent NEOWISE mission, Goethe Link measures 14.58 and 18.18 kilometers in diameter, and its surface has an albedo of 0.194 and 0.251, respectively. The Collaborative Asteroid Lightcurve Link assumes a standard albedo for stony asteroids of 0.20 and calculates a diameter of 15.60 kilometers with an absolute magnitude of 11.4.

Naming 

This minor planet was named in honor of Indianapolis surgeon and philanthropist Dr Goethe Link. He was an enthusiastic amateur astronomer and generous supporter of astronomy, who built the Goethe Link Observatory in the late 1930s and donated it to Indiana University in 1948. The official  was published by the Minor Planet Center on 15 July 1968.

References

External links 
 Asteroid Lightcurve Database (LCDB), query form (info )
 Dictionary of Minor Planet Names, Google books
 Asteroids and comets rotation curves, CdR – Observatoire de Genève, Raoul Behrend
 Discovery Circumstances: Numbered Minor Planets (1)-(5000)  – Minor Planet Center
 
 

001728
001728
Named minor planets
19641012